The Love Movement is the fifth studio album by American hip hop group A Tribe Called Quest, and their last album released during group member Phife Dawg's lifetime. Released on September 29, 1998, by Jive Records, it is a concept album, exploring the lyrical theme of love. Musically, it is a continuation of the group's previous album, Beats, Rhymes and Life, featuring minimalist R&B and jazz-oriented production by The Ummah. The lead single, "Find a Way", charted on the Billboard Hot 100 and was followed by a second single, "Like It Like That". The album debuted at number three on the Billboard 200 and was certified gold by the Recording Industry Association of America (RIAA) on November 1, 1998. The group announced its disbandment a month before the album's release.

Background
The roots of The Love Movement trace back to 1997, when Q-Tip produced a beat intended for The Notorious B.I.G.'s album Life After Death. The Notorious B.I.G. enjoyed the beat when it was played for him, however, Life After Death had already been completed and the beat was not used before his death later that year. Eventually, the beat was used for the song "The Love" on The Love Movement.

The album was originally slated for release in May 1998. However, on February 7, 1998, a fire at Q-Tip's home recording studio destroyed his entire record collection and a computer containing many unreleased songs by the group, including collaborations with producer Jay Dee, delaying the album until September of that year. A month before the album's release, the group announced that it was disbanding.

Music and lyrics
The Love Movement is a continuation of the stripped-down R&B and jazz-infused sound that The Ummah created on Beats, Rhymes and Life. The album contains an instrumental track, "4 Moms", which features a guitar solo by jazz guitarist Chalmers "Spanky" Alford. Lyrically, love is the album's predominant theme, while Q-Tip and Phife Dawg were noted for their "mature", "subtle" and "laid-back" rhymes. The featured rappers were given praise for making the album sound "livelier", as it was criticized for being "a little monotonous" overall. Thomas Golianopoulos of Spin hailed the single "Find a Way" as the group's "final glorious moment" before breaking up.

Reception

The Love Movement debuted at number three on the Billboard 200 and was certified gold by the Recording Industry Association of America (RIAA), on November 1, 1998, with shipments of 500,000 copies in the United States.

The album received mostly positive reviews from music critics. Josef Woodard of Entertainment Weekly described it as "a slamming, seductively textured, and tough display of virtuosic rhyming and tale spinning." Dele Fadele of NME praised it for demonstrating "the continued survival of hip-hop as an artform", calling the album's songs "drug-free psychedelic experiences in which subsonic bass and weird-sounding beats play a large part." Rolling Stones Rob Sheffield believed that the "mature, accomplished niceness" of the album "proves that the Tribe still have the skills — they're just short on thrills." In a negative review, Tim Haslett of Spin wrote that the spontaneity that made The Low End Theory "so much fun" had been "replaced by a shiny patina and a flabby George Benson-esque seriousness, so that the record feels like it was conceived and executed around a major-label conference table."

In a review for AllMusic, critic Stephen Thomas Erlewine noted that "there are plenty of pleasures to be had from careful listening" of the album, and despite its love concept, he felt that "the overall effect is quite similar" to Beats, Rhymes and Life. Nathan Rabin of The A.V. Club stated, "While not as immediately accessible as Tribe's first three albums, it's still consistently solid enough to stand up to repeat listens."

The Love Movement was nominated for a Grammy Award for Best Rap Album, presented at the 41st Grammy Awards in 1999.

Track listing 
All songs produced by The Ummah, except track 11 produced by The Ummah and Bay-Lloyd.

Notes
Tracks 1–4, 7, 8, 11, and 13 credited as "initiated by JD of The Ummah".

Samples

Start It Up
"Sweet Georgia Brown" by The Singers Unlimited
Find a Way
"Technova" by Towa Tei
"Flash It to the Beat" by Grandmaster Flash and the Furious Five  
Steppin' It Up
"Leo: Rosebud" by Cannonball Adderley
Give Me
"Give Me" by I-Level
"Motownphilly" by Boyz II Men
Pad & Pen
"Yearning for Your Love" by The Gap Band
"Graduate Medley" by Gap Mangione

Busta's Lament
"Goin' Through Changes" by Feather
Hot 4 U
"New Horizons" by The Sylvers
Against the World
"Jingling Baby" by LL Cool J
The Love
"La Di Da Di" by Doug E. Fresh and Slick Rick
"Little Sunflower" by Freddie Hubbard
Rock Rock Y'all
"What Can You Bring Me" by Charles Wright & the Watts 103rd Street Rhythm Band

Personnel 
Credits are adapted from AllMusic.

 A Tribe Called Quest – primary artist
 Busta Rhymes – guest artist
 D-Life – guest artist 
 Jane Doe – guest artist
 Mos Def – guest artist 
 Noreaga – guest artist
 Punchline – guest artist
 Redman – guest artist
 Spanky – guest artist, guitar
 Wordsworth – guest artist

 Q-Tip – composer
 James Yancey (Jay Dee) – composer
 Ali Shaheed Muhammad – composer
 Phife Dawg – composer
 The Ummah – engineer, mixing, production
 David Kennedy – engineer, mixing
 Tom Coyne – mastering
 Nick Gamma – art direction, design
 Ron Croudy – design 
 Pascal Lewis – make-up
 Robert Maxwell – photography

Charts and certifications

Weekly charts

Year-end charts

Certifications

References

External links 
 

1998 albums
A Tribe Called Quest albums
Albums produced by J Dilla
Albums produced by Q-Tip (musician)
Jive Records albums